Silver into Gold is a 1987 American short documentary film produced by Lynn Mueller. It was nominated for an Academy Award for Best Documentary Short. The film looks at American athletes Gail Roper and Marion Irvine.

References

External links

1987 films
1987 short films
1987 documentary films
American independent films
American short documentary films
1980s short documentary films
Documentary films about sportspeople
1987 independent films
1980s English-language films
1980s American films